Pentameris insularis is a species of flowering plant in the family Poaceae, native to the Amsterdam and Saint Paul islands. It was first described by William Hemsley in 1884 as Trisetum insulare and transferred to Pentameris in 2010.

References

Danthonioideae
Flora of the Amsterdam and Saint Paul islands
Plants described in 1884